Monique Charlotte Shippen (born 3 January 1993) is an Australian model, singer, songwriter and beauty pageant titleholder who was crowned Miss Earth Australia 2018 and represented Australia at the Miss Earth 2018 pageant. She also was crowned Miss International Australia 2019 and represented Australia at Miss International 2019.

Early life, music and education 
Shippen was born and raised in Sydney, New South Wales to an English father and Filipino mother. She started drama and dance lessons from the age of 4, keyboard at 8, private singing at 9 and self-taught guitar at 13. She sang in the St Mary's Cathedral Choir throughout high school, as well as the Monte Singers (small auditioned group) and College Choir at Monte Sant' Angelo Mercy College.

At the age of 15, Shippen did a songwriting course with Erana Clark (former Australian Idol & XFactor vocal coach), where she co-wrote her first EP 'Not Guilty'. She returned to record a 10 track album 'Headache', at the age of 18, with music and lyrics written herself. Her debut single 'Electrifying' was released on iTunes and an official music video was released on YouTube. The debut single made the semi finalist list of Unsigned Only (2015, 2016) and the International Songwriting Competition (2016). She also toured in a Spice Girls Tribute Band called 'Viva Spice Girls' in 2014, where she played the role of Posh Spice.

Shippen obtained a Bachelor of Arts (Contemporary Music) from Macquarie University, a Certificate III in Early Childhood & Care and a Master of Teaching (Secondary) Music at University of New South Wales. During this time, she worked as a children's party entertainer for Superstar Parties Australia - as princesses, superheroes and celebrities.

In 2020, Shippen auditioned for The Voice Australia Season 9 and made it through to the top 120 (Blind Auditions), however, did not turn a chair.

Beauty pageants

Miss Earth Australia 2018 
Shippen was crowned Miss Earth Australia 2018 at the University of New South Wales Roundhouse on 8 September 2018. She succeeded outgoing Miss Earth Australia 2017 and Miss Earth - Air 2017 Nina Robertson. She also won two special awards - People's Choice Award (highest online votes) and Best Environmental Speech.  It was not her first time to join this pageant, as she had participated previously in 2011, making the top 10. She is passionate about the environment and during her reign participated in local beach clean ups every weekend in the summer/autumn across the Northern Beaches and Eastern Suburbs of Sydney.

Miss Earth 2018 
Shippen represented Australia at the Miss Earth 2018 pageant in Mall of Asia Arena in Pasay where she did not place in the top 18.

Miss International Australia 2019 
Shippen was crowned Miss International Australia 2019 at The Dome Cessnock on 3 August 2019. In addition, she won four special awards - Best in Talent, Miss Social Media, Teal Wings of Hope Ambassador and Ovarian Cancer Awareness. She is an advocate for ovarian cancer awareness through the campaign 'Teal The Beat'. She also promotes the Kindness In Action World Challenge, where she encourages the community to do small acts of kindness everyday, post it on social media and challenge others to do the same.

Miss International 2019 
Shippen represented Australia at the Miss International 2019 pageant in Tokyo Dome City Hall in Tokyo, Japan but did not place in the top 15.

Discography 
Shippen released her debut album 'Headache' with the artist name 'Mon-Ami' in 2011. The album was produced by Christian Laofo (A2). 

She has since released a new single 'Someone Else' in January 2022, under the new artist name 'Monique Charlotte'.

References

External links
Miss Earth Australia Official website

Living people
1993 births
Miss Earth 2018 contestants
Singers from Sydney
Miss International 2019 delegates
Australian beauty pageant winners
Australian female models
Australian songwriters
Australian people of Filipino descent
Australian people of British descent
21st-century Australian  women singers